Glenn Shaw (born July 11, 1938) is a former American football fullback. He played for the Chicago Bears in 1960, the Los Angeles Rams in 1962 and for the Oakland Raiders from 1963 to 1964.

References

1938 births
Living people
American football fullbacks
Kentucky Wildcats football players
Chicago Bears players
Los Angeles Rams players
Oakland Raiders players
People from Paducah, Kentucky